John Barry (March 25, 1745 – September 13, 1803) was an Irish-American officer in the Continental Navy during the American Revolutionary War and later in the United States Navy. He has been  credited as "The Father of the American Navy" (and shares that moniker with John Paul Jones and John Adams) and was appointed a captain in the Continental Navy on December 7, 1775. He was the first captain placed in command of a U.S. warship commissioned for service under the Continental flag.

After the war, he became the first commissioned U.S. naval officer, at the rank of commodore, receiving his commission from President George Washington in 1797.

Early life and education
Barry was born on March 25, 1745, in Ballysampson, Tacumshane, County Wexford, Ireland to a Catholic family. When Barry's family was evicted from their home by their English landlord, they moved to Rosslare on the coast, where his uncle worked a fishing skiff. As a young man, Barry determined upon a life as a seaman, and he started out as a cabin boy.

Career

Barry received his first captain's commission in the Continental Navy on March 14, 1776, signed by John Hancock, president of the Second Continental Congress. Barry was a religious man and began each day at sea with a reading from the Bible. He had great regard for his crew and their well-being and always made sure they were properly provisioned while at sea.

During his naval career Barry commanded the U.S. warships Delaware, Lexington, Raleigh, Alliance and United States.

Command of Lexington
It was the first commission issued by the Continental Congress. The Lexington sailed March 31, 1776. On April 7, 1776, off the Capes of Virginia, he fell in with the Edward, tender to the British man-of-war , and after a desperate fight of one hour and twenty minutes captured her and brought her into Philadelphia.

On June 28, Pennsylvania's brig Nancy arrived in the area with 386 barrels of powder in her hold and ran aground while attempting to elude British blockader . Barry ordered the precious powder rowed ashore during the night, leaving only 100 barrels in Nancy at dawn. A delayed action fuse was left inside the brig, which exploded the powder just as a boatload of British seamen boarded Nancy. This engagement became known as the Battle of Turtle Gut Inlet.

Barry retained command of Lexington until October 18, 1776, and captured several private armed vessels during that time.

Command of Delaware
In 1777, Barry commanded the ship , a brig sailing under a letter of marque and capturing British vessels in the Delaware River.

Command of Raleigh
Her crew scuttled her, but she was raised by the British, who refloated her for further use in the Royal Navy.

Barry authored a signal book published in 1780 to improve communications at sea among vessels traveling in formation.

Command of Alliance
He was seriously wounded on May 29, 1781, while in command of Alliance during her capture of HMS Atalanta and Trepassey.

Barry was successful in suppressing three mutinies during his career as an officer in the Continental Navy.

Commodore commission

On February 22, 1797, he was issued Commission Number 1 by President George Washington, backdated to June 4, 1794. His title was thereafter "commodore". He is recognized as not only the first American commissioned naval officer but also as its first flag officer.

Command of United States
Appointed senior captain upon the establishment of the U.S. Navy, he commanded the frigate United States in the Quasi-War with France. This ship transported commissioners William Richardson Davie and Oliver Ellsworth to France to negotiate a new Franco-American alliance.

Barry's last day of active duty was March 6, 1801, when he brought  into port, but he remained head of the Navy until his death on September 13, 1803, from asthma. Barry died childless.

Later life and death
Barry died at Strawberry Hill, in present-day Philadelphia on September 13, 1803, and was buried in the graveyard of St. Mary's Roman Catholic Church.

The executors of his estate were his wife Sarah, his nephew Patrick Hayes and his friend John Leamy.

Personal life
On October 24, 1768, Barry married Mary Cleary, who died in 1774. On July 7, 1777, he married Sarah Austin, daughter of Samuel Austin and Sarah Keen of New Jersey. Barry had no children, but he helped raise Patrick and Michael Hayes, children of his sister, Eleanor, and her husband, Thomas Hayes, who both died in the 1780s.

Commemorations
 The U.S. Revenue Cutter Commodore Barry, captured off Maine in the War of 1812
 Commodore Barry Park in Brooklyn, New York.  It is the oldest park in the borough. It was renamed for Commodore Barry in 1951, due to its location next to the Brooklyn Navy Yard, which Barry helped found.
 A large statue of Barry stands directly in front of the formal entrance to Independence Hall in Philadelphia, Pennsylvania.
 Four U.S. Navy ships
 USS Barry (DD-2) (1902–1920)
 USS Barry (DD-248) (1921–1945)
 USS Barry (DD-933) (1956–1983)
 USS Barry (DDG-52) (1992–present)
 
 There is a large portrait of Commodore Barry at the Rhode Island State House in Providence; and Title 16 of the Rhode Island Statutes (§ 16-20-3 – Days of special observance) requires observing September 13 as Commodore John Barry Day.
 A statue of Barry overlooks the Crescent Quay in Wexford town in Ireland. It was a gift to the town from the United States and was delivered by a United States Navy destroyer, USS John R. Pierce (DD-753). The statue was unveiled in 1956, and each year a parade and wreath-laying ceremony takes place at the statue to celebrate "Barry Day", commemorated by the Irish Naval Service and the Minister for Defence.
A statue of Barry by Eugene Kormendi is placed in the west court of Dillon Hall at the University of Notre Dame.
 Commodore Barry Bridge, which crosses the Delaware River from Chester, Pennsylvania to Bridgeport, New Jersey.
 John Barry Hall at Villanova University, hosting University ROTC programs
 Commodore Barry Club (Philadelphia Irish Center) Emlen Street and Carpenter Lane, Mount Airy, Philadelphia, Pennsylvania
 Barry Township, Schuylkill County, Pennsylvania
 Commodore John Barry Elementary School in Philadelphia, Pennsylvania
 Commodore John Barry Elementary School in Chicago, Illinois
 Commodore John Barry Division of Ancient Order of Hibernians, Annapolis, Maryland
 Commodore John Barry Division of Ancient Order of Hibernians, National Park, New Jersey
 John Barry Bar, Grand Hyatt Muscat, Muscat, Oman
 September 13, Commodore John Barry Day in New Jersey public schools
 Commodore John Barry Memorial Plaque at Staten Island Borough Hall
 A new plaque with a cannon was dedicated on March 10, 2007, in Port Canaveral.
 A plaque stands in the city of Boston on Boston Common.
 A plaque commemorating Barry and his crew of the Alliance for the final naval battle of the American Revolution is located at Jetty Park in Cape Canaveral, Florida.
 A stone plaque commemorating his grave site is located at Old St. Mary's Church in Philadelphia, PA.
 A six-foot bronze statue of Commodore John Barry stands in Franklin Square (between I and K streets on 14th St. N.W.) in Washington, D.C.
 Barry Hall is one of six military barracks facilities at the United States Merchant Marine Academy in commemoration of him.
 The visitor entrance to the United States Naval Academy, from Downtown Annapolis to the Visitor's Center, commemorates Commodore John Barry. Inside the entrance is a monument to Commodore Barry with a plaque with an image of his commission, Number 1 in the United States Navy.  Both the gate and the monument were erected by the Ancient Order of Hibernians

See also

 Bibliography of early American naval history
 Commodore Stephen Decatur
 Commodore John Hazelwood
 Irish military diaspora
 William Brown (admiral), "Father of the Argentine Navy"
 List of people on stamps of Ireland

References

Footnotes

Bibliography
  URL
  URL
  URL
  URL
  URL
  URL
 
  URL

Further reading

External links

 
 Father of the American Navy
 Portraits of Barry
 Barry-Hayes Collection, papers at Independence Seaport Museum, Philadelphia, Pennsylvania, digitized by Villanova University's Digital Library, Villanova, Pennsylvania.

1745 births
1803 deaths
18th-century American naval officers
18th-century Irish people
19th-century American naval officers
19th-century Irish people
American Catholics
American military personnel of the Quasi-War
Continental Navy officers
Irish-American history
Irish sailors in the United States Navy
Irish sailors
Kingdom of Ireland emigrants to the Thirteen Colonies
People from County Wexford
People of colonial Pennsylvania
People of Pennsylvania in the American Revolution
United States Navy commodores